Samir Jafar oglu Bayramov (born 18 January 1999) is a Russian former professional footballer of Azerbaijani descent.

Club career
He made his professional debut in the FNL for FC Zenit-2 Saint Petersburg on 4 August 2018 in a game against Tom Tomsk.

He retired at the age of 21 due to health problems.

References

External links
  Profile by FNL
 

Russian footballers
1999 births
Living people
Association football defenders
Russian sportspeople of Azerbaijani descent
Azerbaijani expatriate footballers
Azerbaijani expatriate sportspeople in Russia
FC Zenit-2 Saint Petersburg players